Lotario is Latin, Italian, and Spanish masculine given name, while Lotário is Portuguese masculine given name. Both names are modern forms of the Germanic Chlothar (which is a blended form of Hlūdaz and Harjaz). People with this name include:

Surname
 Bonifacio di Castel Lotario (died 1504), Italian Roman Catholic prelate

Given name 
Lotario dei Conti di Segni, birthname of Pope Innocent III (1160 or 1161 – 1216), Italian Roman Catholic Pope

Fictional character
Lotario, alto character in Handel opera, Lotario
Lotario, a character in Miguel de Cervantes’s Don Quixote

See also 

Lothario

Notes

Latin masculine given names
Italian masculine given names
Spanish masculine given names